A by-election was held in the Trinidad and Tobago constituency of Chaguanas West on July 29, 2013 following the forced resignation of Jack Warner just three months prior.

Results

References

By-elections in Trinidad and Tobago
2013 in Trinidad and Tobago